Koorda is a town in the north eastern Wheatbelt region of Western Australia, approximately  east of Perth and  north of Wyalkatchem at the northeastern end of the Cowcowing Lakes. It is the main town in the Shire of Koorda. At the 2016 census Koorda had a population of 414.
The surrounding areas produce wheat and other cereal crops. The town is a receival site for Cooperative Bulk Handling.

History
In 1913 the government decided to construct a railway from Wyalkatchem to Mount Marshall (southeast of Bencubbin), and the Central Cowcowing Progress Association requested that land be set aside for a townsite at the proposed siding in this area. In 1914 the Jirimbi and Mulji Progress Association again requested a townsite here, and also in 1914 the proposed siding here was named Koorda at the suggestion of J Hope, the Chief Draftsman in the Lands Department. Hope took the name from a list of words obtained from a Noongar in the Margaret River area, the meaning being given as a "married person". Problems regarding resumption of land for the townsite and the exact siting of the siding meant that the townsite was not gazetted until 1917.

In 1932 the Wheat Pool of Western Australia announced that the town would have two grain elevators, each fitted with an engine, installed at the railway siding.

Politics
Polling place statistics are shown below showing the votes from Koorda in the federal and state elections as indicated.

References

External links

Towns in Western Australia
Wheatbelt (Western Australia)
Grain receival points of Western Australia